Emily Cranston is a Canadian chemist who is a professor and the University of British Columbia President’s Excellence Chair in Forest Bioproducts. She investigates nano cellulose and hybrid materials. Cranston was awarded the Tappi NanoDivision Technical Award in 2021.

Early life and education 
Cranston was born in Halifax, Nova Scotia. After completing high school, she moved to Quebec. She was an undergraduate student at McGill University, where she studied chemistry and worked on multi-media tools for teaching chemistry and studied biodegradable polymers. She earned her doctorate under the supervision of Derek Gray. Her doctoral research developed multi-layer polyelectrolyte films that contained nano crystalline cellulose. She then moved to the KTH Royal Institute of Technology, where she worked as a postdoctoral scholar investigating the properties of cellulose.

Research and career 
Cranston returned to Canada in 2011, and joined the faculty at McMaster University. Her research considers the colloid and surface chemistry of biopolymers. She has particularly focused on the development of nanocellulose microstructures that can be used in a broad range of applications, including packaging, electrical components and cosmetics. Nanocellulose is produced from wood pulp, and possesses an exceptionally high mechanical strength. In particular, Cranston looks to improve compatibility between the components in composites, to understand their potential toxicity and standardised metrological measurements.

Awards and honours 
 2016 KINGFA Young Investigator’s Award
 2018 Kavli Foundation Emerging Leader in Chemistry Lecturer
 2021 E.W.R. Steacie Memorial Fellowship
 2021 Tappi NanoDivision Technical Award

Selected publications

References 

Living people
People from the Halifax Regional Municipality
McGill University alumni
Academic staff of the University of British Columbia
21st-century Canadian chemists
Canadian women chemists
Year of birth missing (living people)